Sir Robert George Howe  (born Derby, England, 19 September 1893, died 22 June 1981) was a British diplomat who served as Governor-General of the Sudan from 1947 to 1955.

Education
Howe was educated at Derby School and St Catharine's College, Cambridge.

Career

Sixth Royal Dublin Fusiliers
Third Secretary at British Embassy, Copenhagen, 1920
Second Secretary, Copenhagen, 1920–1922
Second Secretary, Belgrade, 1922–1924
Second Secretary, Rio de Janeiro, 1924–1926
First Secretary, Rio de Janeiro, 1926
First Secretary, Bucharest, 1926–1929
Foreign Office, 1930–1934
Acting Counsellor at Peking, 1934–1936
Counsellor, Peking, 1936
British Minister in Riga, 1940–1942
British Minister in Abyssinia, 1942–45
Assistant Under-Secretary of State, Foreign Office, 1945
Governor-General of the Sudan, 1947–1955
retired from Diplomatic Service, 1955
Justice of the Peace, Cornwall, 1955–1968
Mayor of Lostwithiel, Cornwall

Family
In 1919, Howe married Loveday Mary Hext (1892-1970), and they had one son.

Honours
Companion of the Order of St Michael and St George, 1937
Knight Commander of the Order of St Michael and St George, 1947
Knight Grand Cross of the Order of the British Empire, 1949

References
Howe, Sir Robert George in Who Was Who 1897-2006 online, from HOWE, Sir Robert George (accessed August 23, 2007)

1893 births
1981 deaths
Alumni of St Catharine's College, Cambridge
People educated at Derby School
Knights Commander of the Order of St Michael and St George
Knights Grand Cross of the Order of the British Empire
People from Derby
Ambassadors of the United Kingdom to Ethiopia
Ambassadors of the United Kingdom to Latvia
20th-century British diplomats
British people in the Anglo-Egyptian Sudan